Granite State College is a public college in Concord, New Hampshire.  It is part of the University System of New Hampshire.

History
Founded in 1972 and headquartered in Concord, Granite State College is one of the four institutions of the University System of New Hampshire. Its mission is to serve adult students of all ages and it provides mostly online classes. Dr. Mark Rubinstein announced his resignation as president of the college on July 1, 2021, to pursue the role of Chancellor of the Community College System of New Hampshire.

Academics
Accredited by the New England Commission of Higher Education, Granite State College offers associate and bachelor's degrees, master's degrees, post-baccalaureate programs for teacher education, transfer opportunities, and 100% online degree programs.

In 2021 Granite State College undergraduate business programs were ranked 92nd and its graduate business programs were ranked 99th among "Best Online Degree Programs" by U.S. News & World Report. In 2017,  Granite State College was ranked 13th in ranking in Washington Monthly's 2017 rankings and 1st in New England.

Locations
Granite State College is headquartered in Concord and maintains a campus in Manchester, as well as online. The college nurtures strong partnerships with the Community College System of New Hampshire, which include on-site classrooms at Nashua Community College and the Lebanon campus of River Valley Community College. Additional partnerships with Manchester Community College and Great Bay Community College (Pease International Tradeport campus) provide shared resources and transfer pathways for local students.

References

External links

 Official website

Distance education institutions based in the United States
Public universities and colleges in New Hampshire
University System of New Hampshire
Universities and colleges in Merrimack County, New Hampshire
Educational institutions established in 1972
1972 establishments in New Hampshire
Claremont, New Hampshire
Lebanon, New Hampshire
Education in Nashua, New Hampshire
Education in Manchester, New Hampshire
Education in Portsmouth, New Hampshire
Rochester, New Hampshire
Liberal arts colleges in New Hampshire